Jennifer Sue Huppert (born 13 October 1962) is an Australian politician. Born in Melbourne, Victoria, she was a solicitor before entering politics. On 3 February 2009, she was appointed to the Victorian Legislative Council as a Labor member for Southern Metropolitan Region to replace Evan Thornley, who retired.

Huppert was second on the Labor ticket for the Southern Metropolitan Region in the 2010 election, but was defeated.

References

1962 births
Living people
Australian Labor Party members of the Parliament of Victoria
Members of the Victorian Legislative Council
Politicians from Melbourne
Jewish Australian politicians
21st-century Australian politicians
21st-century Australian women politicians
Women members of the Victorian Legislative Council